The Brunei national rugby union sevens team is the national men's rugby team for Brunei.

The team competes in the IRB Asian Sevens Series. In 2009, the team defeated Laos and Indonesia during the inaugural IRB Asian Sevens Series in 2009.

In 2016, the team competed in the Borneo 7s in Sandakan and the Singapore SEA 7s.  Brunei placed 6th out of 8, above Singapore development and Indonesia.

IRB Asian Sevens Series record

Current Squad
current squad
As at 31 October 2009 for the Borneo and Sri Lanka tournaments:

Honours
 2009 Brunei 7s Plate Runners up

References
 McLaren, Bill A Visit to Hong Kong in Starmer-Smith, Nigel & Robertson, Ian (eds) The Whitbread Rugby World '90 (Lennard Books, 1989)

National rugby sevens teams
Rugby union in Brunei
National sports teams of Brunei